The Dreamer of Oz: The L. Frank Baum Story is a 1990 American made-for-television biographical film starring John Ritter as Lyman Frank Baum, the author who wrote the 1900 novel The Wonderful Wizard of Oz and thirteen other Oz books. Also starring in it were Annette O'Toole as Baum's supportive wife, Maud, and Rue McClanahan as Baum's tough mother-in-law, Matilda Gage.

Plot

The film depicts how L. Frank Baum came to create The Wonderful Wizard of Oz while undergoing and eventually overcoming professional and personal failures. The story is interspersed with the famous Oz story, shown at certain points when Baum is writing down his ideas. It is shown that he was originally telling this to a group of kids, who asked him the name of this location, to which he looks at a file cabinet with the bottom drawer marked O-Z and decided "Oz". Another idea he had thought of was to say Dorothy was born in the Dakota Territory, only to scrap that sentence in favor of Kansas.

Cast
John Ritter as L. Frank Baum
Annette O'Toole as Maud Gage Baum.
Rue McClanahan as Matilda Electa Joslyn Gage
Charles Haid as Al Badham / Cowardly Lion
David Schramm as W.W. Denslow
Nancy Lenehan as Harriet Alvena Baum Neal
Courtney Barilla as Dorothy Leslie Gage / Dorothy Gale
Nancy Morgan as Helen Leslie Gage
Jason Ritter as Harry Neal Baum
Pat Skipper as Charlie H. Gage
Ed Gale as Ned Brown / Farmer
Trevor Eyster as Frank Joslyn Baum (5-9 years) (as Tim Eyster)
Joshua Boyd as Frank Joslyn Baum (3 years)
Roger Steffens as Salesman (as Roger Steffans)
John Cameron Mitchell as Albert the Reporter
Frank Hamilton as Sullivan
Steven Gilborn as George M. Hill
Jerry Maren as Mr. Munchkin
Elizabeth Barrington as Mrs. Munchkin
David Ellzey as Scarecrow
Derek Loughran as Tin Man (as Derek Loughram)
Christopher Pettiet as Teenage Frank Jr.
Ryan Todd as Robert Stanton Baum
Alexis Kirschner as Tweety Robbins
Paul Linke as Opie Read (uncredited)

Reception
In his TV Preview, Tom Shales of The Washington Post proclaimed the film 'cheerfully satisfying', and praised the production values, but wasn't impressed with Ritter's performance. John J. O'Connor of The New York Times praised Ritter's performance and called the film 'heartwarming'. Howard Rosenberg of the Los Angeles Times dubbed it 'long on mush and short on magic', but praised the recreations from the original stories.

References

External links
 
 

1990 television films
1990 films
1990s biographical films
American biographical films
Films directed by Jack Bender
Films with screenplays by Richard Matheson
Films scored by Lee Holdridge
NBC network original films
Films based on The Wizard of Oz
Biographical films about writers
Oz studies
L. Frank Baum
1990s American films